Ester de Lemos, sometimes written as Esther, (born 1929) is a university professor, translator and Portuguese writer. A supporter of the Estado Novo regime, she was a member of the National Assembly of Portugal between 1965 and 1969.

Early life
Maria Esther Guerne Garcia de Lemos Trigueiros de Martel was born in the parish of Carvalhal in Bombarral in the District of Leiria in central Portugal on 2 November 1929. She was the seventh and last daughter of Ester Guerne and Jaime Garcia de Lemos, who had fought in World War I. She graduated in Romanic Philology from the University of Lisbon in 1952. From 1954 she worked on radio programmes on literary topics. Between 1957 and 1963 she was an assistant professor at the Faculty of Arts at the University of Lisbon. In 1963, she interrupted her teaching to work on a doctorate, but fell out with her supervisor, Jacinto Prado Coelho, who was president of the Portuguese Society of Writers, and did not complete the thesis. She then worked as a linguistic consultant, resuming teaching in 1971. Following the overthrow of the Estado Novo in 1974, she lost her job at the University of Lisbon. She then became a secondary school teacher. She taught at the Higher Institute of New Professions in Lisbon from 1990.

Political career
Lemos was a convinced Catholic and a strong supporter of the Estado Novo. She was included on the regime's list of candidates for the 1965 election, which assured automatic election. During her term in the National Assembly, she was on committees concerned with education, popular culture and spiritual and moral interests.

In addition to contributing to magazines for very young children, she also wrote for the magazine published by the Mocidade Portuguesa Feminina, the organization of the Estado Novo established for girls, for which membership was compulsory. She also collaborated with the neofascist magazine Tempo Presente.

Writing and translation
In her research Lemos paid particular attention to the works of the Portuguese writers Camilo Castelo Branco and José Maria de Eça de Queirós and wrote prefaces to editions of their work. She translated, and wrote books about Giovanni Boccaccio and Francesco Petrarch and others. She also wrote novels and children's stories. For her novel, Companheiros, she was awarded in 1960 the Eça de Queirós prize by the Secretariado Nacional de Informação, the propaganda arm of the Estado Novo.

Publications
Publications written by Lemos include:
D. Maria II: a rainha e a mulher (D. Maria II: the queen and mother)
A borboleta sem asas (The wingless butterfly), 1958
Na aurora da nossa poesia (On the dawn of our poetry), 1950s 
Companheiros (Companions), 1962
A Rainha de Babilónia (The Queen of Babylon). Children's stories, 1962
A literatura infantil em Portugal (Children's literature in Portugal), 1972
Boccaccio, 1972
Petrarca, 1972
Camões, 1972
Rapariga (Girl), 1985
Picapau: O balão cor de laranja e outras histórias (The orange balloon and other stories), 1986
Terra de ninguém: contos (Land of no one: stories), 1994
Mesmo Bom para Ler na Páscoa (Really good to read at Easter), Children's, 2019

References

1929 births
Living people
People from Leiria District
Members of the Assembly of the Republic (Portugal)
Women members of the Assembly of the Republic (Portugal)
Portuguese women writers
Portuguese translators
University of Lisbon alumni
Academic staff of the University of Lisbon